Microheliella is a monotypic genus of protists containing the sole species M. maris, first described in 2012. It has a variety of unusual morphological characteristics which make its broader classification difficult. These include a centrosome with two concentric granular shells and axopodia much simpler in structure than in visually similar protists (other 'heliozoa').

Recent phylogenomic analyses suggest the microhelida are sister to the Cryptista, forming a clade called Pancryptista, which would be sister to the Archaeplastida.

References

Endohelean genera